The following radio stations broadcast on FM frequency 99.5 MHz:

Argentina
 Blu Radio in San Juan
 Cordillerana in San Martín de los Andes, Neuquen
 De la ciudad in Tornquist, Buenos Aires
 LRM748 Del Siglo in Rosario, Santa Fe
 Estilo in Posadas, Misiones
 Frecuencia Romántica in Villa Mercedes, San Luis
 Imagen in Comandante Luis Piedra Buena, Santa Cruz
 La Arena in Santa Rosa, La Pampa
 Mágica in El Quebrachal, Salta
 Maza in San Miguel, Buenos Aires
 Mega San Luis in San Luis
 País in Perico, Jujuy
 Radiovision in Comodoro Rivadavia, Chubut
 Radio María in Coronel Pringles, Buenos Aires
 Radio María in La Plata, Buenos Aires
 Radio María in Tandil, Buenos Aires
 Radio María in Monte Buey, Córdoba
 Radio María in La Rioja
 Sophia FM in Salta
 Universal Pedro Luro in Pedro Luro, Buenos Aires
 Zumba la turba in Córdoba

Australia
 ABC Western Plains in Mudgee, New South Wales
 Radio National in Grafton, New South Wales
 4RGC in Cairns, Queensland
 Triple J in Mackay, Queensland
 3GPH in Geelong, Victoria
 TRFM in Latrobe Valley, Victoria
 TRFM in Sale, Victoria
 Star FM (Australia) in Mildura, Victoria

Canada (Channel 258)
 CBAN-FM in Edmundston, New Brunswick
 CBCV-FM-1 in Metchosin/Sooke, British Columbia
 CBZF-FM in Fredericton, New Brunswick
 CBZF-FM-1 in McAdam, New Brunswick 
 CFBE-FM in Baie James, Quebec
 CFBG-FM in Bracebridge, Ontario
 CHOO-FM in Drumheller, Alberta
 CHRL-FM in Roberval, Quebec
 CIML-FM in Makkovik, Newfoundland and Labrador
 CIMM-FM in Ucluelet, British Columbia
 CJBC-2-FM in Kingston, Ontario
 CJPX-FM in Montreal, Quebec
 CKBZ-FM-3 in Merritt, British Columbia
 CKKW-FM in Kitchener, Ontario
 CKSB-8-FM in Brandon, Manitoba
 CKTY-FM in Truro, Nova Scotia
 CKUA-FM-12 in Spirit River, Alberta
 VF2397 in Weyburn, Saskatchewan
 VF2499 in Saskatoon, Saskatchewan
 VOAR-2-FM in Marystown, Newfoundland and Labrador

China 
 CNR The Voice of China in Zhangjiakou

Malaysia
 Hot FM in Seremban, Negeri Sembilan

Mexico
XHAF-FM in Celaya, Guanajuato
XHDR-FM in Guaymas, Sonora
XHEZZZ-FM in Tapachula, Chiapas
XHFEM-FM in Hermosillo, Sonora
XHGZ-FM in Gómez Palacio, Durango
XHLS-FM in Guadalajara, Jalisco
XHMAT-FM in Mazatlán, Sinaloa
XHMS-FM in Monclova, Coahuila
XHRTM-FM in Macuspana, Tabasco
XHSBT-FM in San Buenaventura, Chihuahua
XHSMT-FM in Santa María Tecomavaca, Oaxaca
XHTGM-FM in Tangancícuaro, Michoacán
 XHTVR-FM in Tuxpan, Veracruz
XHUTX-FM in Tlaxcala, Tlaxcala
XHUZH-FM in Zimapán, Hidalgo

Philippines
DWRT-FM in Metro Manila
DYRT-FM in Cebu City
DXBT in Davao City
DWCM-FM in Legazpi City
DYRF-FM in Iloilo City

United States (Channel 258)
  in Republic, Missouri
 KAKS in Goshen, Arkansas
  in International Falls, Minnesota
 KBIJ in Guymon, Oklahoma
 KBLL in Helena, Montana
 KBTA-FM in Batesville, Arkansas
  in Lawton, Oklahoma
 KCAZ in Rough Rock, Arizona
 KCPH-LP in Corpus Christi, Texas
  in Eldora, Iowa
  in Little Rock, Arkansas
 KDJL in Kilgore, Nebraska
 KETT in Mitchell, Nebraska
 KFNP-LP in North Pole, Alaska
 KFSL-LP in Fossil, Oregon
 KFXX-FM in Klamath Falls, Oregon
 KGU-FM in Honolulu, Hawaii
  in Hays, Kansas
 KHCR in Bismarck, Missouri
 KHDL in Americus, Kansas
 KHEA-LP in La Marque, Texas
  in Hamburg, Arkansas
  in Tucson, Arizona
  in San Antonio, Texas
 KJKQ in Sisseton, South Dakota
 KJMX in Reedsport, Oregon
  in Bountiful, Utah
  in Los Angeles, California
  in Le Mars, Iowa
 KKPS in Brownsville, Texas
 KKTU-FM in Fallon, Nevada
 KLHQ in Hotchkiss, Colorado
  in Greenfield, California
  in Citrus Heights, California
 KLXI in Fruitland, Idaho
 KMCJ in Colstrip, Montana
  in Albuquerque, New Mexico
  in Rancho Mirage, California
 KMTB in Murfreesboro, Arkansas
  in Bryan, Texas
  in Lake Charles, Louisiana
  in Lakeport, California
 KOHV-LP in Houston, Texas
  in Mobridge, South Dakota
 KPLX in Fort Worth, Texas
  in Perham, Minnesota
 KQBG in Rock Island, Washington
 KQBR in Lubbock, Texas
 KQMT in Denver, Colorado
 KQTC in Christoval, Texas
 KRKI in Keystone, South Dakota
 KRPH in Morristown, Arizona
 KRYI-LP in Yuba City, California
 KSIQ-LP in St. Louis, Missouri
 KSJN in Minneapolis, Minnesota
 KTWH-LP in Two Harbors, Minnesota
  in Fairbury, Nebraska
 KVLJ-LP in Victoria, Texas
 KVRY-LP in Santa Barbara, California
  in Portland, Oregon
 KWSF-LP in Mesa, Arizona
 KXBL in Henryetta, Oklahoma
 KXFB-LP in Fallbrook, California
 KXGO in Willow Creek, California
  in Las Cruces, New Mexico
 KZDV in Rattan, Oklahoma
 KZGU in Garapan-Saipan, Northern Mariana Islands
 KZLY in Ione, Oregon
  in Pullman, Washington
  in Key West, Florida
  in Ripley, Ohio
 WBAI in New York, New York
 WBDY-LP in Binghamton, New York
 WBUJ-LP in Miami Shores, Florida
 WBUS in Centre Hall, Pennsylvania
  in Point Pleasant, West Virginia
 WCOY in Quincy, Illinois
  in Lowell, Massachusetts
  in Buffalo, New York
 WDZN in Midland, Maryland
  in Jackson, New Hampshire
 WFPM-LP in Battle Creek, Michigan
  in Cleveland, Ohio
 WHGV in LaCrosse, Florida
 WHIM-LP in Hialeah Gardens, Florida
  in Washington, District of Columbia
  in Wilmington, Delaware
  in Pittsfield, Maine
  in Beckley, West Virginia
  in Willacoochee, Georgia
  in Corbin, Kentucky
 WKDQ in Henderson, Kentucky
  in Fort Walton Beach, Florida
  in Aiken, South Carolina
 WLLY-FM in Clewiston, Florida
 WLOV-FM in Daytona Beach Shores, Florida
  in High Point, North Carolina
 WMJV in Grifton, North Carolina
 WMKK-LP in Richmond, Kentucky
  in Negaunee, Michigan
  in Southport, New York
  in Omro, Wisconsin
 WPSB-LP in Ocean City, Maryland
 WQAT-LP in Belton, South Carolina
  in Saint Petersburg, Florida
  in Socastee, South Carolina
  in New Orleans, Louisiana
  in Schenectady, New York
 WSEF-LP in Dalton, Georgia
  in Bridgeport, New York
  in Chicago, Illinois
  in Scranton, Pennsylvania
  in Christiansted, Virgin Islands
 WYCD in Detroit, Michigan
  in Madisonville, Tennessee
  in New Martinsville, West Virginia
 WYSS in Sault Sainte Marie, Michigan
  in Emporia, Virginia
 WZIM in Lexington, Illinois
  in Greenfield, Indiana
  in Birmingham, Alabama

Lists of radio stations by frequency